The Progressive Conservative Party of Ontario is a political party in Ontario, Canada which ran a full slate of candidates in the 2011 Ontario provincial election.

By-elections

References

2011
Prog